COPUS may stand for:

Julia Copus (born 1969), British poet, radio dramatist and children's writer
Committee on the Public Understanding of Science, UK organisation
Coalition on the Public Understanding of Science, US organisation
COPUS (band), a rap jazz fusion ensemble